Oliver Emert (December 9, 1902 – August 13, 1975) was an American set decorator. He won an Academy Award in the category Best Art Direction for the film To Kill a Mockingbird.

Selected filmography
 Abbott and Costello Meet Frankenstein (1948)
 Operation Petticoat (1959)
 To Kill a Mockingbird (1962)
 The Ghost and Mr. Chicken (1966)

References

External links

1902 births
1975 deaths
American set decorators
Best Art Direction Academy Award winners